Rod Thomas (born 10 October 1970) is an English former footballer. At just 14, he was being hailed as 'the next Pelé' while in Watford's youth set-up, however by 23, he was playing for Carlisle United in the fourth tier. He played in the 1997 Football League Trophy Final as Carlisle emerged victorious.

Honours
With Carlisle United
Football League Third Division champion: 1994–95
Football League Trophy winner: 1996–1997
Football League Third Division third place promotion winner: 1996–97

References

External links

England stats at TheFA

1970 births
Living people
English footballers
England under-21 international footballers
Watford F.C. players
Gillingham F.C. players
Carlisle United F.C. players
Chester City F.C. players
Brighton & Hove Albion F.C. players
English Football League players
Association football forwards
Association football midfielders